Sibylle Matter (born 2 September 1973 in Hergiswil, lives in Plaffeien) is an athlete from Switzerland and physician.  She competes in triathlon.

Matter competed at the first Olympic triathlon at the 2000 Summer Olympics.  She took thirty-sixth place with a total time of 2:13:25.38.

External links
Trisuisse profile: Sibylle Matter
 Sibylle Matter on swissolympians (in German) 

1973 births
Living people
Triathletes at the 2000 Summer Olympics
Olympic triathletes of Switzerland
Swiss female triathletes
Sportspeople from Nidwalden